Adelman or Adelmann is a surname of German origin, and means "nobleman", being a combination of "adel" (nobility) and "mann" (man). The name may refer to:

People 
 Adelmann of Liège (died 1061), Italian bishop
 Bob Adelman (1930–2016), American photographer
 David E. Adelman, American lawyer and academic
 David I. Adelman (born 1964), American diplomat and lawyer
 David J. Adelman (born 1972), American businessman, entrepreneur, and philanthropist
 Georg von Adelmann (1811–1888), German physician
 Howard Adelman (born 1938), Canadian philosopher
 Irma Adelman (1930–2017), American economist
 Janet Adelman (1941–2010), American scholar
 Jeremy Adelman (born 1960), American historian
 Jeremy Adelman (composer) (born 1973), American musician
 Kenneth Adelman (born 1946), American diplomat and writer
 Lynn Adelman (born 1939), American judge
 Martyn Adelman (born 1947), British photographer and former drummer
 Paul Adelman, British historian
 Rick Adelman (born 1946), American basketball player and coach
 Saul Adelman (born 1944), American astronomer
 Skippy Adelman (1924–2004), jazz photographer
 Uri Adelman (1958–2004), Israeli writer and musician
 Warren Adelman (born 1963), American businessman
Lee Adelman (born 1962), American businessman

See also 
 Addelman
 Adleman
 Edelman
 Edelmann

References 

German given names
German-language surnames
Jewish surnames
Yiddish-language surnames